Antje Frank (born 5 June 1968 in Bartmannshagen) is a German rower.

References 
 
 

1968 births
Living people
German female rowers
Rowers at the 1992 Summer Olympics
Olympic bronze medalists for Germany
Olympic rowers of Germany
Medalists at the 1992 Summer Olympics

World Rowing Championships medalists for East Germany